Tobias Edward Rosenthal, known as Toby (15 March 1848 in Strasburg, Prussia23 December 1917 in Munich) was a German-American genre and portrait painter. He generally claimed to have been born in New Haven, Connecticut.

Biography
Shortly after he was born, his parents emigrated to the United States. They settled in San Francisco in 1858 and his father, Jakob, worked as a tailor. He had expressed a strong desire to be a painter, so they enrolled him at a drawing school operated by a French-born sculptor named Louis Bacon. There, he attracted the attention of the expatriate Mexican artist, Fortunato Arriola, who gave him free lessons. 

In 1865, at Arriola's urging, his parents raised the money to send him to Munich, where he became a pupil at the Academy of Fine Arts. His instructors there included Alexander Strähuber and Karl Raupp. Later, he attended master classes taught by Karl Theodor von Piloty. His painting of Johann Sebastian Bach and his family at their morning prayers (1870) was awarded a medal and purchased by the State Museum in Leipzig.

During his stay there, his father had been publishing his letters in the local newspapers. When he returned home, in 1871, he found himself the center of attention, and received numerous commissions for portraits. Despite that, the constant socializing became monotonous, and he went back to Munich. There he painted "The Beautiful Elaine" (1874), based on a work by Alfred Tennyson, which had been commissioned by a banker in San Francisco. It proved to be a difficult painting, so Rosenthal requested more money for it, but was refused. He then sold it to someone else for several times the originally promised amount. His breach of contract created a small scandal.

In 1876, he participated in the Centennial Exposition in Philadelphia. He was awarded another medal in 1883 for "Trial of the Escaped Nun Constance de Beverley", based on the poem Marmion by Sir Walter Scott, now on display at the Los Angeles County Museum of Art.

Except for an occasional visit to his family, he spent the rest of his life in Germany and married a local banker's daughter, although he continued to accept commissions from America. He died in 1917, at the age of sixty-nine, and was interred in the Nordfriedhof. His works may be seen at the Art Institute of Chicago and the De Young Museum.

Selected paintings

Notable works

 "Love's Last Offering"
 "Spring's Joy and Sorrow" (1868)
 "J.S. Bach and his family at morning prayers" (Leipzig Museum; 1870)
 "The beautiful Elaine," after a ballad of Alfred Tennyson (1874)
 "Young Monk in Refectory" (1875)
 "Forbidden Longings"
 "Who laughs last, laughs best," a humorous genre diptych
 "Girls' Boarding-School Alarmed" (1877)
 "A Mother's Prayer" (1881)
 "Empty Place" (1882)
 "Trial of the escaped nun Constance de Beverly," after Walter Scott's Marmion (Los Angeles County Museum of Art; 1883)
 "Dancing Lesson During the Empire"
 "Departure from the Family"
 "Out of the Frying-Pan into the Fire," one of the most popular of his works, and frequently engraved (1871)

Writings
 Toby E. Rosenthal, Erinnerungen eines Malers (Memoirs of a painter), Munich: Richard Pflaum, 1927.

References

 Emil van der Vekene, Toby Edward Rosenthal und Constance de Beverley. Eine Dokumentation. Luxemburg, 2011. 130 pages .

External links

 More works by Rosenthal @ ArtNet

1848 births
1917 deaths
Academy of Fine Arts, Munich alumni
19th-century American painters
19th-century American male artists
American male painters
20th-century American painters
20th-century American male artists